Riquelme Point is a point projecting 450 m into the southwest part of Discovery Bay from Parvomay Neck, Greenwich Island in the South Shetland Islands, Antarctica and forming the west side of the entrance to Vinett Cove.

The feature was named by the 1947 Chilean Antarctic Expedition after Signalman Riquelme, a crewman of the frigate Iquique.

Location

Maps
 L.L. Ivanov et al. Antarctica: Livingston Island and Greenwich Island, South Shetland Islands. Scale 1:100000 topographic map. Sofia: Antarctic Place-names Commission of Bulgaria, 2005.
 L.L. Ivanov. Antarctica: Livingston Island and Greenwich, Robert, Snow and Smith Islands. Scale 1:120000 topographic map.  Troyan: Manfred Wörner Foundation, 2009.

References
 SCAR Composite Antarctic Gazetteer.

Headlands of Greenwich Island